The Age of Quarrel is the first album by the New York hardcore band Cro-Mags. It was released on then-independent Profile Records in September 1986. It was subsequently re-released by Another Planet in 1994, along with the band's second album, Best Wishes, on the same disc. 

The video for "We Gotta Know" (directed by guitarist Parris Mayhew) received airplay on MTV at the time (during their alternative music show 120 Minutes and later on Headbangers Ball) and was one of the first-ever clips on MTV to feature slam dancing and crowd surfing.

Overview 
The album was primarily written by cofounders Parris Mayhew and Harley Flanagan. Most of the songs are executed at speed with vocals from John Joseph, which inspired many sound-a-likes. However, "Malfunction", "Seekers of the Truth" and "Life of My Own" are slower songs that foreshadowed the more metallic influences on their next project, the crossover thrash bracketed Best Wishes. 

The title refers to Kali Yuga, this term originating from the Sanskrit language can be translated into the "Age of Quarrel", "Age of Deception" or "Age of Illusion". Kali Yuga is the fourth age (and current) of the world in the Sanatan Dharma or Hindu tradition, characterized by general degradation, spiritual degeneration, and illusion;

Parris Mayhew has credited the Canadian progressive rock trio Rush as a direct inspiration on several riffs on the album. 

The image on the front album cover is a photograph taken during the Castle Romeo H-bomb test.

Reception and legacy 

Critical reception to The Age of Quarrel has been met with positive reviews and ratings. Vincent Jeffries of AllMusic awards it four-and-a-half out of five stars and claims in hindsight that "the Cro-Mags helped define the East Coast hardcore movement with their now legendary debut, Age of Quarrel." He later states that "Age of Quarrel is loaded with hardcore classics like 'World Peace,' 'We Gotta Know,' and 'Street Justice.' On these cuts and throughout the record, Mayhew presents what were at the time cutting-edge post-Motörhead punk/metal riffs, and the entire group execute their roles with passion, dexterity, and extreme focus. It's practically impossible to understand or appreciate New York hardcore without first spending time listening to Age of Quarrel."

In 2005, The Age of Quarrel was ranked number 274 in Rock Hard magazine's book of The 500 Greatest Rock & Metal Albums of All Time.

Earth Crisis frontman Karl Buechner said that watching the video of "We Gotta Know" was "the spark that set off" his love for hardcore punk music and, during a 1996 interview, he would describe The Age of Quarrel as "still the greatest hardcore album of all time". Jamey Jasta of Hatebreed stated that the song "Life of My Own" inspired him to become a musician and named The Age of Quarrel one of the most crucial albums in hardcore's history.

Cro-Mags performed the songs "It's the Limit" and "Hard Times" in a 1988 film called The Beat as "Iron Skulls".

"It's the Limit" was featured in the 2008 video game Grand Theft Auto IV. It was featured on the "LCHC" radio station, referring to Liberty City Hardcore.

Track listing 
Lyrics by John Joseph, Harley Flanagan, and Eric Casanova. Music by Parris Mitchell Mayhew and Harley Flanagan.

Personnel 
Cro-Mags
 John Joseph – vocals
 Parris Mitchell Mayhew – rhythm guitar
 Doug Holland – lead guitar
 Harley Flanagan – bass
 Mackie Jayson – drums

Production
 Recorded in 1986 at Eastside Studios, New York City
 Produced by Chris Williamson
 Engineered by Steve Remote
 Mixed by Chris Williamson and Steve Remote
 Digitally transferred at Aura Sonic Ltd, New York City

Additional production
 Reissue remastered by Alan Douches at West Westside Music

References

External links 
 Official Cro-Mags website
 Parris Mayhew's Cro-Mags website

Profile Records albums
1986 debut albums
Cro-Mags albums
Albums free for download by copyright owner